Flender is a surname. Notable people with the surname include:

Rodman Flender (born 1962), American actor, writer, director, and producer
Ulrike Fitzer (born 1982), born Ulrike Flender, German Air Force pilot

See also
Flender Werke, German shipbuilding company